In Tennessee, U.S. Route 64 (US 64) stretches  from the Mississippi River (Arkansas state line) in Memphis to the North Carolina state line near Ducktown. The highway, along with US 72, is a major route for travel between Memphis and Chattanooga.

History
The route between Cleveland and the eastern end of the Ocoee Scenic Byway follows the route of the Old Copper Road, a wagon trail dating back to the 1830s used for transporting copper from the mines in the Copper Basin to Cleveland and Chattanooga.

The route originally continued westward from downtown Cleveland, crossing the Tennessee River at a ferry in Hamilton County, through Soddy-Daisy and across the Cumberland Plateau, and joined where the concurrency splits from US 41 (now part of Interstate 24) near Pelham. This designation was removed in 1940 after the Chickamauga Dam went into operation, flooding much of the original route, and the route was moved to its present concurrency with US 11 and 41. Much of this original route no longer exists even as county maintained road. The Tennessee Department of Transportation (TDOT) has plans to restore this route with a new four lane highway and toll bridge across the Tennessee River, providing Clevelanders with a more convenient access to Nashville.

The Ocoee Scenic Byway was the first National Forest Scenic Byway in the nation, designated on July 22, 1988 by the United States Forest Service (USFS). TDOT plans to remove the designation of US 64 from the Ocoee Scenic Byway, and build a new four lane route, due to the high volumes of commercial traffic passing through the area. Multiple methods have been proposed, including a route on the south side over the river and existing route, a route over nearby Little Frog Mountain, and a tunnel.

The final project, in Hardin County, was completed in the fall of 2017.

In November 2009, a massive rock slide closed the Ocoee Scenic Byway for several months. This was reportedly the largest rockslide in the area's history.

Route description

US 64 enters Tennessee on the Memphis-Arkansas Bridge in Memphis. The route shares the bridge with Interstate 55 (I-55) and US 61, US 70, and US 79. The route traverses several streets in Memphis before becoming a rural divided highway in eastern Shelby County. The highway runs directly to the east through the county seats of Tennessee's most southern counties including Oakland, Somerville, Whiteville, Bolivar, Selmer, Adamsville, Savannah, Waynesboro, and Lawrenceburg, the largest on the route between Memphis and I-65. The route then interchanges with I-65, and runs through Fayetteville, Winchester, and comes to an interchange with I-24 near Pelham. The route unofficially runs concurrent with I-24 across Monteagle Mountain, the stretch across the Cumberland Plateau, often cited as one of the most hazardous stretches of highway in the United States and splits at exit 152 near Kimball where it then enters Jasper, becoming concurrent with US 41, of which it crosses Nickajack Lake, part of the Tennessee River to Chattanooga. The route then becomes concurrent with US 11 and runs to Cleveland, where it splits and runs along US 74 into Polk County to the North Carolina state line. The section beginning in Cleveland and continuing into North Carolina is part of Corridor K of the Appalachian Development Highway System. The easternmost portion of the highway along the Ocoee River is the Ocoee Scenic Byway, a winding, two-lane road through the Ocoee River gorge. The steep terrain around the highway is subject to rockslides. This is one of the only sections of US 64 in Tennessee that is still two lanes.

Bypass route

A bypass route exists for the route in Cleveland. The east–west route is part of a beltway around the business district known as APD-40, and stretches from I-75 to a cloverleaf interchange with US 64 and SR 60. SR 60 makes up the remainder of the route. Part of the route is controlled access, and an interchange with US 11/64 is located approximately a mile from the western terminus.

Junction list

State Route 40

State Route 40 (SR 40) runs as a secret, or hidden designation for US 64/US 74 from downtown Cleveland, in Bradley County to the North Carolina state line near Ducktown, in Polk County. SR 40 was also a former designation for part of APD-40, which is the origin of part of the common name of that route. State Route 40 becomes secondary east of its intersection with SR 60 in Cleveland.

State Route 433

State Route 433 (SR 433) is the unsigned designation for US 64’s southern and eastern bypass of the cities of Winchester and Decherd in Franklin County, Tennessee. The entire route is a four-lane divided highway (which is known locally as Veterans Memorial Drive), with interchanges at SR 16 (1st Avenue/Rowe Gap Road), US 41A (S College Street/Cowan Highway), and SR 50 (Nissan Powertrain Drive).

References

External links

 Tennessee
64
Transportation in Shelby County, Tennessee
Transportation in Fayette County, Tennessee
Transportation in Hardeman County, Tennessee
Transportation in McNairy County, Tennessee
Transportation in Hardin County, Tennessee
Transportation in Wayne County, Tennessee
Transportation in Lawrence County, Tennessee
Transportation in Giles County, Tennessee
Transportation in Lincoln County, Tennessee
Transportation in Franklin County, Tennessee
Transportation in Grundy County, Tennessee
Transportation in Marion County, Tennessee
Transportation in Hamilton County, Tennessee
Transportation in Bradley County, Tennessee
Transportation in Polk County, Tennessee
Transportation in Chattanooga, Tennessee
Transportation in Memphis, Tennessee